Mansuriyeh-e Sadat (also Romanized as Manşūrīyeh-ye Sādāt; also known as Mansūra, Manşūreh, Manşūrīyeh, and Manşūrīyeh-ye Yek) is a village in Anaqcheh Rural District, in the Central District of Ahvaz County, Khuzestan Province, Iran. At the 2006 census, its population was 37, in 9 families.

References 

Populated places in Ahvaz County